The Inter Baku 2006–07 season was Inter Baku's sixth Azerbaijan Premier League season, and their first season under manager Valentin Khodukin. They finished 4th in the league and were knocked out of the Azerbaijan Cup at the Semi-Final stage by Khazar Lankaran.

Squad

Transfers

Summer

In:

Out:

Winter

In:

Out:

Competitions

Azerbaijan Premier League

Results
Source:

Table

Azerbaijan Cup

Source:

Squad statistics

Appearances and goals

|-
|colspan="14"|Players who appeared for Inter Baku and left during the season:

|}

Goal scorers

Notes
 Qarabağ have played their home games at the Tofiq Bahramov Stadium since 1993 due to the ongoing situation in Quzanlı.

References

External links 
 Inter Baku at Soccerway.com

Shamakhi FK seasons
Inter Baku